Richard C. Bosson is a former justice of the New Mexico Supreme Court. He was appointed in 2002 and served until October 30, 2015 when he retired. He had served as a judge on the New Mexico Court of Appeals between 1994 and 2002.

References

Living people
Year of birth missing (living people)
Place of birth missing (living people)
Georgetown University Law Center alumni
New Mexico state court judges
Justices of the New Mexico Supreme Court
University of Virginia School of Law alumni
Wesleyan University alumni